This is a list of the Singapore Top 30 Digital Streaming number-one songs in 2018, according to the Recording Industry Association of Singapore.

Chart history

References

2018 in Singapore
Singapore
2018